Harry Laurie (born November 2, 1944) is a retired professional basketball player who spent one season in the American Basketball Association (ABA) as a member of the Pittsburgh Condors during the 1970–71 season. He attended St Peter's College where he was drafted in the eighth round (98 overall pick) of the 1968 NBA draft by the Detroit Pistons, but he never played for them.

External links
 

1944 births
Living people
American men's basketball players
Basketball players from Jersey City, New Jersey
Detroit Pistons draft picks
Pittsburgh Condors players
Point guards
Saint Peter's Peacocks men's basketball players